Victor Garaigordobil Berrizbeitia (17 October 1915 – 24 April 2018) was a Spanish bishop of the Catholic Church. At the time of his death, at the age of 102, he was the oldest bishop of Spain.

Life
Garaigordóbil was born in Abadiano, Biscay (Basque Country).

Ordained a priest on 27 June 1943.

He was appointed Prelate of the Diocese of Babahoyo and titular bishop of Pudentiana on 29 November 1963.

He was consecrated bishop of the Titular see of Pudentiana on 30 January 1964.

He resigned as titular bishop of Pudentiana on 5 January 1978 and from the Prelate of the Diocese of Babahoyo on 12 May 1982.

References

1915 births
2018 deaths
Basque Roman Catholic priests
People from Abadiño
Spanish Roman Catholic bishops
Participants in the Second Vatican Council
20th-century Roman Catholic bishops in Ecuador
Spanish centenarians
Spanish expatriates in Ecuador
20th-century Spanish clergy
Men centenarians
Roman Catholic bishops of Babahoyo